Bowlesia is a genus of flowering plant in the family Apiaceae, with over 15 accepted species.

Species 
All unresolved and accepted species include:

 Bowlesia argenticaulis
 Bowlesia hieronymusii
 Bowlesia integerrima
 Bowlesia incana
 Bowlesia lobata
 Bowlesia palmata
 Bowlesia paposana
 Bowlesia macrophysa
 Bowlesia lobata
 Bowlesia venturii
 Bowlesia tenella
 Bowlesia uncinata
 Bowlesia tropaeolifolia
 Bowlesia sodiroana
 Bowlesia setigera
 Bowlesia paposana
 Bowlesia flabilis
 Bowlesia grandifolia
 Bowlesia multiradiata
 Bowlesia lata
 Bowlesia elegans
 Bowlesia elata
 Bowlesia crenata
 Bowlesia cana

References 

Apiaceae genera
Azorelloideae
Taxa named by José Antonio Pavón Jiménez